Olivier Boumal (born 17 September 1989) is a Cameroonian professional footballer who plays as an winger for Al-Merrikh SC. Between 2017 and 2019 he made six appearances for the Cameroon national team.

Career
Boumal began his career with George Fominyen FC before moving to Europe in 2005 signing with CFF Paris. After one year with the team from Paris he joined the youth and reserve team of AS Saint-Étienne.

In January 2010, he signed a 2.5-year contract with Superleague club Panetolikos, after a successful trial. He also played for Levadiakos and Iraklis Psachna.

In summer 2014, Boumal signed a two-year contract to Panionios for an undisclosed fee. At the end of 2014–15 season, he was linked with a move to Turkish club Mersin İdmanyurdu.

On 23 December 2015, Boumal joined Panathinaikos  on a 2.5-year contract for a reported transfer fee of €400,000 plus one Panathinaikos player Christos Donis, Kostas Triantafyllopoulos and Diamantis Chouchoumis. On 11 January 2016, he made his club debut by having an appearance along with a late goal, helping his club to a 2–0 win against Kalloni. On 31 January 2016, in a 3–2 away win against Platanias, Boumal broke his collarbone which required surgery and would keep him out of action for 4–6 weeks.

On 6 July 2017, Boumal signed 1.5-season contract with Chinese Super League club Liaoning Whowin for a €2.2 million fee, leaving Panathinaikos after 18 months.

On 14 February 2019, he returned to Panionios on a free transfer. 

Boumal joined FC Saburtalo Tbilisi of the Georgian Erovnuli Liga in August 2020 on a one-year contract.

In August 2021, Boumal joined Australian club Newcastle Jets on a one-year contract.

International career
Boumal played for the Cameroon national under-20 football team the 2009 FIFA U-20 World Cup.

On 29 May 2017, Olivier Bumal was included for the first time in Cameroon's squad for Morocco on 10 June for the 2019 Africa Cup of Nations qualifiers and the Confederations Cup to be held from 17 June to 2 July in Russia. Cameroon will participate in the second group with Chile, Australia and Germany, representing Africa. On 10 June 2017, he made his international debut as a late substitute in a 1–0 2019 Africa Cup of Nations qualifiers win against Morocco.

Honours
Panetolikos 
Beta Ethniki: 2010–11

References

External links
  
 
 
 
 Kicker Profile

Living people
1989 births
Footballers from Douala
Association football wingers
Cameroonian footballers
AS Saint-Étienne players
Albacete Balompié players
Panetolikos F.C. players
FC Astra Giurgiu players
Levadiakos F.C. players
Panathinaikos F.C. players
Yokohama F. Marinos players
Panionios F.C. players
Liaoning F.C. players
FC Saburtalo Tbilisi players
Newcastle Jets FC players
Super League Greece players
J1 League players
Chinese Super League players
Erovnuli Liga players
A-League Men players
Expatriate footballers in France
Expatriate footballers in Spain
Expatriate footballers in Greece
Expatriate footballers in Romania
Expatriate footballers in China
Expatriate footballers in Japan
Expatriate footballers in Georgia (country)
Expatriate soccer players in Australia
Cameroonian expatriate sportspeople in France
Cameroonian expatriate sportspeople in Spain
Cameroonian expatriate sportspeople in Greece
Cameroonian expatriate sportspeople in Romania
Cameroonian expatriate sportspeople in China
Cameroonian expatriate sportspeople in Japan
Cameroonian expatriate sportspeople in Georgia (country)
Cameroonian expatriate sportspeople in Australia
Cameroon under-20 international footballers
2017 FIFA Confederations Cup players
2019 Africa Cup of Nations players
Cameroon international footballers